Quentin George Keynes (17 June 1921 – 26 February 2003) was an explorer, writer, filmmaker, and bibliophile.

Keynes was born in London, the second son of Geoffrey Keynes and his wife Margaret, the daughter of George Howard Darwin who in turn was the son of Charles Darwin, making Keynes Darwins's great-grandson. He was also the nephew of the renowned economist, John Maynard Keynes.  His older brother Richard was a physiologist, and younger brothers Milo and Stephen both writers.

Keynes moved to the United States in 1939.  Shortly after the Second World War he started his life as an explorer of Africa and sub-equatorial islands of the Atlantic and Indian Oceans. He made several films, and wrote several articles for the National Geographic Magazine. He collected books principally on the great explorers of the 19th century, but also travel, natural history and modern literature.

A biography of him was published in 2004 by his nephew, the historian Simon Keynes.

See also
Keynes family

References
by S.D. Keynes (2004) Quentin Keynes (1921-2003) Explorer, Film-Maker, Lecturer, and Book-Collector 

1921 births
2003 deaths
Darwin–Wedgwood family
Quentin
Writers from London
British explorers of Africa
English book and manuscript collectors
Bibliophiles
British emigrants to the United States